The Pogroms of the Russian Civil War were a wave of mass murders of Jewish civilians, primarily in Ukraine, during the Russian Civil War. In the years 1918–1920, there were 1,500 pogroms in over 1,300 localities, in which 50,000 to 250,000 Jews were murdered. All armed forces operating in Ukraine were involved in the killings, in particular the Ukrainian People's Army and the Armed Forces of South Russia. It is estimated that more than a million people were affected by material losses, 50,000 to 300,000 children were orphaned, and half a million were driven out from or fled their homes.

Background
From 1791, Jews living in the Russian Empire were almost exclusively only allowed to live in Pale of Settlement, in the western part of the country. There was also a ban on holding state and public positions. In the years 1881–1884 and 1903-1906, vast waves of pogroms took place.

During World War I, almost half a million Jews fought in Imperial Russian Army. However, the command of the Russian army was prejudiced against the Jews. Academy officers were convinced that Jews undermined the power of the tsar, blamed them for not recognizing God in  Jesus of Nazareth and stigmatized them as foreigners. During the war, much of the Russian population blamed Jews for causing food shortages and price inflation, or for spreading rumors about the lack of weapons, despite it being one of the most widely known public secrets. The situation was complicated by the establishment of the "German Committee for the Liberation of Russian Jews" in Germany, whose founders saw the war with Russia as a method of liberating Russian Jews from the Tsarist autocracy.

During the withdrawal of Russian troops in 1915 from Congress Poland, under pressure from the Central Powers, the military command deported 250,000 Jews deep into Russia. 350,000 more refugees joined this number. Their property was plundered frequently. In the new premises, the newcomers did not receive legal security.

The factor that strongly weakened the Jews' ability to defend themselves was the lack of their own state, especially the army. The dispersion of the population across the territories of several countries and the division of forces during World War I meant that Jews found themselves on different sides of the front. On each of these sides, they were collectively accused of favoring the enemy, including spying on behalf of the opposing army. Espionage suspects were usually hanged without a trial. According to the historian Peter Kenez, most of the accusations of desertion, after being executed, turned out to be false. A rising atmosphere of antisemitism caused pogroms to break out in Stanyslaviv, Chernivtsi and Tarnopol, during the withdrawal of Russian troops from the region.

After Tsarism was overthrown, on 2 April 1917, Alexander Kerensky's Provisional Government abolished the Pale of Settlement and repealed the restrictions on national and religious minorities. These decisions resulted not only in the flourishing of Jewish cultural and political life, but also led many Jews to enthusiastically support the Kerensky government. At that time, the most supported political movement was Zionism, with 300,000 members. 34,000 people belonged to the General Jewish Labour Bund in 1917. At the same time, support for communism was slim: the 1922 Russian Communist Party census showed that, before 1917, only 958 members were of Jewish origin. Most Russian Jews had no reason to support communism: the Kerensky government, which granted them equality and looked favorably on their cultural development, completely satisfied them, and communism as an atheistic ideology opposed to private enterprise, was against Judaism and the livelihood of many Jews.

The first major pogroms (1917–1918) 
With the start of Russian Civil War, large amounts of weapons fell into the hands of irregular armed forces. As a result of the weakness of the civil authority and the collapse of traditional ties, Jews became a particular target of attacks. Antisemitic canards, such as a belief in an international Jewish conspiracy, were widely propagated.

The internal destabilization of Russia was a direct result of the October Revolution. Between November and December, there were antisemitic pogroms in sixty towns, including Bender, Tiraspol, Kharkiv, Kiev and Vitebsk. The unexpected elevation of Jewish communists to prominent positions within the Soviet government additionally inflated antisemitic sentiments. In districts where Jewish inhabitants were the majority, their clear representation in the authorities contributed to an increase in resentment among non-Jewish residents. In turn, the communists saw the Jewish community as the bourgeoisie, the class they fought against. During the withdrawal of Red Army from Chernihiv province in the spring of 1918, the Red Army, motivated by "fighting against the bourgeoisie", committed pogroms against Jews, including in Chernihiv and Hlukhiv, where about 400 Jewish residents were murdered within two days.

In January 1918, Central Council of Ukraine promulgated a declaration of independence of the Ukrainian People's Republic. Of the territory that would later become part of the Soviet Union, the largest number of Jews lived in Ukraine (1.6 million out of 2.6 million). The General Jewish Labour Bund, which supported Ukrainian autonomy, this time opposed separation from Russia. Other socialist parties abstained. The Ukrainian national movement was infuriated by the lack of support.

Already by the middle of the month there were pogroms in Bratslav, combined with looting and arson. In turn, on 20 January in Kiev, during the fights between Ukrainian and Soviet forces, over a hundred Jews were killed and Jewish shops were plundered.

In April 1918, as a result of a coup d'état in agreement with the Central Powers, the military leader Pavlo Skoropadskyi seized power and established the Ukrainian State. At that time, the authorities issued proclamations that collectively blamed Jews for spreading anti-German sentiment and participating in the black market. In March 1918 in Kiev, during the takeover of the city by the Ukrainian-German forces, haidamaks of the  captured and shot Jews. There were also murders in Kremenchuk and Hoholeve.

In November 1918, the Polish–Ukrainian War broke out. On 21 November, Polish troops under the command of Czesław Mączyński took over from Ukrainian Galician Army in Lviv. The next day, some soldiers, civilians and militia volunteers initiated a pogrom against the Jewish and Ukrainian populations. After three days of violence, among several hundred victims, between 52 and 150 Jews were killed, about 450 were injured, and about 500 houses and shops were plundered. The troops of general Józef Haller also carried out pogroms in Sambir and Horodok.

In total, during the years of 1917 and 1918, there were 90 pogroms, most of which occurred between August and October 1917 and between March and May 1918.

Ukrainian pogroms (January-July 1919) 
In November 1918, the Ukrainian Hetmanate was replaced by Directorate of Ukraine, and on 22 January 1919, the re-established Ukrainian People's Republic carried out a unification with the West Ukrainian People's Republic. In February, Symon Petliura became the president of the Directorate. At the same time, starting in January 1919, the Red Army initiated an invasion of Ukraine from the east. In order to internally integrate its own troops, the Directorate used anti-Semitic agitation. Pogroms were launched on a massive scale in places where Ukrainian nationalists felt threatened. By the summer of 1919, various Ukrainian forces had murdered over 30,000 Jewish civilians.

In mid-January 1919, the troops of  stationed in Ovruch killed 80 inhabitants and plundered approximately 1,200 houses. The otaman blamed the Jews who had gathered in the market square "for Bolshevism" and demanded a large ransom. Despite collecting tribute, the order to stop the pogrom was not obeyed. The events ended only with the withdrawal of the otaman's troops under the pressure of the Bolsheviks. At that time, in Zhytomyr, soldiers, joined by peasants from nearby villages, started a pogrom, killing 80 people and plundering property. Two months later, during the takeover of the city by the Ukrainian People's Army, a rumor was spread among the soldiers that 1,300 Christians had allegedly been murdered by Jews. It was a rumor based on the killing of 22 people by the Bolsheviks, which had actually included Jewish victims. A delegation of city officials managed to convince the commanders that the accusation was false, but it was too late to convince the rank-and-file. Despite the escape of many Jews from the city, during the pogrom that lasted five days, 317 people were murdered and many injured. Many Jews were saved by some of the city's Christian inhabitants, who provided them with shelter. The pogrom ceased with the recapture of the city by Bolshevik troops on 24 March.

The February massacres in Proskuriv and the adjacent  in Podolia province were among the bloodiest acts of antisemitic violence during the war in Ukraine. In Proskuriv, the local Bolsheviks planned an armed uprising on 15 February. Despite the opposition of the Jewish socialist parties and the warnings of the city guard, and without consulting the inhabitants, the Bolsheviks went ahead with their coup attempt. However, they were quickly defeated by the Cossack army. The head of the stationed brigade, Ivan Semesenko, then issued a speech to the soldiers in which he blamed the Jews for the incidents, marking them with the epithet "the most dangerous enemies of the Ukrainians and Cossacks" and ordering their "extermination". Cossacks burst into Jewish homes and massacred entire families for three hours. The pogrom was stopped thanks to the intervention of the front commander. However, 1,200–1,400 people were killed, and 300 of those wounded died soon after. In the following days, the otaman issued a proclamation on antisemitic rhetoric, and only collecting the ransom removed the threat of a resumption of the pogrom.

Some Bolshevik rebels tried to take over the nearby Felsztyn, but they scattered after hearing about the defeat of the Proskuriv uprising. This episode terrified the Jewish inhabitants of the town. On 17 February, several hundred Cossacks encircled Felsztyn and the next morning they unleashed a massacre. Soldiers killed residents in their homes or after dragging them out into the street, and robbed houses and shops. There were also numerous rapes. According to one eyewitness account, the head of the post office and telegraph office did not react to the incidents, although he was aware of them. As a result of the pogrom that lasted several hours, 600 out of 1,900 Jewish inhabitants of the town were murdered.

Between February and April, there were fights between the Cossacks and the Bolsheviks in the area of Balta. There was a pogrom during each of the Ukrainian takeovers. In total, 100-120 Jewish inhabitants died, and almost all houses and shops were devastated.

Pogroms were often repeated in the same places. Between May 1919 and March 1921 there were 11-14 riots in Bratslav, during which a total of over 200 Jews were killed and 1,200 people lost their homes. There were also cases of capturing Jewish passengers on ships. About 100 Jews were separated from the rest of the passengers and drowned in the river.

In May, the violence increased. On 10 May, raiders killed 258 people and wounded 150 in the village of Kryve Ozero. The forces of Nykyfor Hryhoriv showed particular cruelty. Initially, they recognized the command of the Red Army and, together with its troops, in March and April 1919 carried out operation to capture Kherson, Nikolayev and Odessa from the Allies. But at the beginning of May, Hryhoriv launched an anti-Bolshevik uprising. He published a "Universal", in which he called for the overthrow of Ukrainian Soviet Republic, which he described as "foreigners from Moscow and the country where Christ was crucified". In a short time, his troops committed a series of massacres.

After the capture of Trostianets on 10 May, the Jewish residents were taken to the police station building. At the same time, at a meeting of the city council, a rumor was spread about the alleged relief of Jewish relief from the vicinity. The angered crowd went to the police station building, which they shot at and threw grenades inside, before killing the wounded. From 342 to over 400 Jews died. At the same time, property was plundered and women were raped. Between 15 and 22 May, a pogrom took place in Oleksandrivka, as a result of the unleashed antisemitic agitation. Hryhoriv's troops, together with a part of the local population, killed over 210 inhabitants there. Famine and epidemic typhus flared up in the village soon after.

The bloodiest pogrom of that period took place in Yelysavethrad, which on 10 May was taken over by Hryhoriv's troops. His "Universal" was distributed in the streets and agitation was initiated. On 15 May, the soldiers started a pogrom. In a typical case, a group of several soldiers, after invading a house, murdered its inhabitants and plundered valuable property. Then the house was taken over by a crowd that plundered the rest of the property, loading it onto carts. In the three-day slaughter, between 1,300 and 3,000 people died, despite many cases of Christians hiding their Jewish neighbors. Almost all of the 50,000 Jewish inhabitants of Yelysavethrad were pushed into poverty. Hospitals were overcrowded with the wounded and famine broke out. Red soldiers were sent to recapture Yelysavethrad, only for them to join in the pogrom. The pogrom in Cherkasy had a similar course, where on 15 May, Hryhoriv's troops started plundering Jewish houses and killing their inhabitants. Soon some of the townspeople joined the attackers. Despite some Christians hiding their Jewish neighbors, 700 people died in the five-day pogrom.

Other pogroms committed in May by Hryhoriv's troops include the massacres in Katerynoslav (150 deaths), in Kodyma (120 deaths) and Oleksandrivka- (over 160 deaths).

In Uman, 35,000 out of the city's 60,000 inhabitants were Jews. In Tsarist times, however, administrative positions were occupied by Christians. The arrival of Soviet rule in March 1919 made some Jews join the authorities. This change caused the Jews to be collectively blamed for the Soviet policy of food requisitioning. On 10 May, an anti-Bolshevik uprising broke out and soon Hryhoriv's troops took over the city. They carried out searches of homes, claiming to be looking for "communists". But in fact, random Jews were murdered, and the non-Jewish communists were not disturbed. During the 10-day pogrom, 300-400 people died. Some of the Christian residents hid their Jewish neighbors. Ukrainian peasants also refused to sell food to Jews. The pogrom was finally ended by the intervention of the 7th Soviet Regiment, but three days later the Regiment was ordered to move to a different location, and Uman would be under the control of the 8th Ukrainian Soviet Regiment. The 8th regiment committed another pogrom after assuming power. 150 Jews were killed by the Reds over the next six weeks. On 3 July the 8th regiment was replaced by the 1st Ukrainian Soviet Cavalry of Fedor Gribenko, which committed another pogrom of similar scale. Two days after, the International 4th Regiment, which was made not only of Ukrainians, Russians, and Jews, but also foreign volunteers from China, Hungary, and Germany, came in control of the city. The arrival of this regiment marked the end of the pogroms in Uman.

The situation was somewhat similar in the multiethnic Lityn. The advent of the Soviet power opened up the possibility for Jews to join the government, which some took advantage of. Initially, there were no ethnic disputes among the residents. However, when the troops of  took over the city on 14 May, they initiated a pogrom in which 100-120 people were murdered. It was also noted that peasants refused to sell food to Jews.

On 12 May, the troops of  captured Haisyn. 340-350 of the town's Jewish inhabitants died in the pogrom they committed. The violence was stopped thanks to the appeal of Russian intellectuals. In turn, in Radomyshl, peasant units of  initiated a series of pogroms in which 400 to 1,000 were killed.

The most serious pogrom committed by Ukrainian forces in July was the Tulchyn massacre. On 14 July, the attackers killed 519 of the town's Jewish inhabitants. At the end of the month, Uman was encircled again. On 29 July, a group of haydamaks captured the city and started a pogrom, killing 150 people.

On 15 July, the Seventeenth of Tammuz in the Hebrew calendar, locals turned on their Jewish neighbours in Slovechno, modern-day Zhytomyr Oblast after being told false rumours that Jews were planning to attack Gentiles, convert churches into synagogues, and force Gentiles by pressure into Judaism. More than 60 Jewish civilians were killed as an ensuing pogrom broke out and 45 to 100 injured.

There was a Jewish self-defense unit in Pohrebyshche. However, when the forces of Danylo Terpylo captured the town on 18 August, the Jewish resistance collapsed. Armed groups stormed Pohrebyshche and killed 350-400 of its Jewish inhabitants within a few hours. In the same month, in the town of Justingrad-Sokolivka, Terpylo's forces kidnapped 150 Jews, demanding the release of a high ransom. The requested amount could not be collected and almost all hostages were murdered.

White pogroms (September 1919 - March 1920) 
Many Jews opposed collectivization and pinned their hopes on the advancing White movement. Experienced with Ukrainian pogroms, they were willing to give up their autonomy in favor of a livable life and a return to the rule of law.

However, the Armed Forces of South Russia displayed entrenched antisemitic prejudices and they had already stood against the equal rights of minorities established in 1917. In their view, the Jews were responsible for the fall of Tsarism and supported Bolshevism as a whole, and the Protocols of the Elders of Zion were widely distributed among the White forces. The antisemitism of the Whites was supported by a significant part of the clergy of the Russian Orthodox Church, who saw Jews as a godless people who wanted to take power over the "Holy Rus". On the other hand, Patriarch Tikhon of Moscow unequivocally condemned the pogroms. In a pastoral letter of 21 July 1919, he wrote that rapes of Jews were "a disgrace to their perpetrators, a disgrace to the Holy Church."

However, the White Cossack units, especially Terek Cossacks, had the greatest share in the massacres at the hands of the Volunteer Army. Pogroms were carried out mainly for the purpose of plunder and under the influence of collectively blaming the Jews for their failure in battle.

The Volunteer Army controlled the Ukrainian lands between the summer of 1919 and the spring of 1920. After almost every seizure of a city by White troops, there was a pogrom against its Jewish inhabitants. The violence particularly intensified in the autumn and winter, during the retreat of the White Army.

In September 1919, Cossack units of the Volunteer Army captured Fastov. Between 23 and 26 September, they carried out a massacre, during which 1,300-1,800 Jewish people died. Many families were burned alive in their own homes. Children and those hiding in synagogues were also killed. There were also gang rapes and looting. The military authorities ordered the pogrom to be stopped, but the Jewish quarter of the city was ruined.

Three weeks later, the forces of the Volunteer Army pushed the Bolsheviks out of Kiev. After the army entered the city on 16 October, a pogrom broke out. The attackers broke into houses, plundered property and murdered Jewish people. At the height of the riots, the newspapers of the Black Hundreds published an article accusing Jews of shooting at soldiers during the takeover of the city, listing their personal details. The commission set up to investigate these allegations soon found that they had been fabricated. In the five-day wave of violence, 500-600 people were killed.

The greatest escalation of violence took place in Tetiyev. On 26 March 1920, Cossack troops scattered around the city and began killing Jewish residents. The synagogue complex, where about 1,500 people were hiding in the attic, was set on fire. Most of them were asphyxiated by smoke, and those who escaped through the windows were killed. Some local peasants participated in the pogrom, killing Jews or handing them over to their attackers and loading the stolen property onto carts. Out of the 7,000 Jewish inhabitants of Tetiyev, 4,000-5,000 died, and almost the entire town was ruined.

Some towns experienced pogroms from several sides. Bila Tserkva was such a city, where Jews were the target of violence, successively by the Ukrainian People's Army, then by Terpylo's forces, and finally by Cossack troops in the White Army. The total number of victims of pogroms in Bila Tserkva between 1919 and 1920 is given at 300-850 people.

Balance and aftermath

Number of pogroms 
According to estimates by historian J.L. Dekel-Chena, in the years 1917–1918 there were 90 pogroms. Researcher Oleg Budnitskii reports that between 1918 and 1920 there were a total of 1,500 pogroms in Ukraine, in over 1,300 localities. In turn, according to Milton Kleg, in 1919 alone, the number of pogroms in Ukraine was 1,326.

Estimates of the number of victims and their geographical distribution 
According to Peter Kenez, the pogroms of Jewish civilians in Ukraine in 1918–1920 were the largest case of mass murder against Jews before the Holocaust. It was the first time in the history of modern Europe that uniformed armed forces murdered civilians on such a massive scale.

According to various sources, between 50,000 and 250,000 people died. The number of 50-60 thousand victims is given as the lower bound. Eli Heifetz, chairman of the All-Ukrainian Committee for Aid to Victims of the Pogrom, in 1921, on the basis of the data available to him, estimated the number of deaths at 120,000. The same conclusions were reached in 1999 by David Vital. According to Manus Midlarsky and Yitzhak Arad's 2005 and 2009 estimates, the death toll was 150,000. These estimates included those who died as a result of wounds, as well as victims of hunger and epidemics of infectious diseases following pogroms. Lidia Miliakova wrote that 125,000 Jews were killed in Ukraine and 25,000 in Belorussia. Oleg Budnitskii in his monograph mentions 200,000 victims as an upper estimate. In turn, according to Peter Kenez, the death toll amounted to a quarter of a million people.

According to Lidia Miliakova the majority (78%) of pogroms occurred in Ukraine, while 14% and 8% happened in Belorussia and Russia respectively.

Estimates of other losses 
Based on the partial reports of the Red Cross, Eli Heifetz estimated that more than one million people suffered material losses. About 50,000-300,000 children were left orphans and half a million inhabitants were driven out of their homes or left. According to Z. Gitelman, in the years 1918–1921, 70–80% of the Jewish population was without regular income, although the Soviet ban on private trade was a partial cause of unemployment.

Estimates of the contribution of the forces carrying out the pogroms 
Manus Midlarsky and Oleg Budnitskii reported that, according to earlier estimates, the Ukrainian People's Army caused 54% of the casualties, the White Army caused 17%, and the Red Army caused 2%. However, according to more recent statistics, carried out after the opening of the Russian archives, the percentage of homicides at the hands of the Volunteer Army may even reach 50%. The YIVO Encyclopedia of Jews in Eastern Europe said that a plurality of the pogroms (25%) were committed by groups independent from both Reds and Whites, followed by the White Army at 17% and the Soviets at 9%. YIVO also gives an estimate of 38 people killed in the average pogrom by Ukrainian forces, 25 in the average White pogrom, and 7 in the average Red pogrom.

The involvement in the pogroms of the anarchist Revolutionary Insurgent Army of Ukraine movement, led by Nestor Makhno, is still unclear. The Makhnovists themselves confirmed their complicity in one pogrom by anarchists that killed 22 Jews in Gorkaya, for which the culprits were arrested and convicted. However, Boris D. Bogen reported that anarchists had killed a number of Jews in Kazanka. Whether or not they were responsible for the 1918 massacre of 175 to 1,000 residents of the Jewish localities of Trudoliubovka and Nechaevka, Yekaterinoslav Governorate, is under dispute. Many residents of the town said that the massacre had been committed by the Anarchists, and in a 1964 letter a survivor wrote that "many Jewish settlements were massacred by bandits called Machnovtsi including ours. My father, husband, brothers Shmilik, Pinchas and Velvl were murdered."

Political consequences 
All armed groups committed pogroms against Jews and spread anti-Semitism. Only among the Soviet forces was the number of pogroms relatively small, and  Due to this situation, some Jews began to support the Bolsheviks by necessity, despite the clear differences in their worldview and lifestyle. Sometimes, after a pogrom at the hands of the White forces, the Jewish inhabitants fled directly to the Soviet positions, looking for shelter there. However, according to Manus Midlarsky, in 1922, out of 1,773,000 Ukrainian Jews, only 8,250 identified themselves as communists, and only 5% of Soviet communists identified themselves as Jews.

See also 
 Pogroms in the Russian Empire
 The Cossack riots of 1648 in Ukraine, in which 40-50,000 Jews were killed primarily by the Cossack forces of Bohdan Khmelnytsky.
 Antisemitism in Ukraine
 History of the Jews in Ukraine

References

Bibliography

 
 
 
 
 
 
 
 
 
 
 
 
 
 
 
 
 
 
 
 
 
 
 
 
 
 
 
 
 
 
 
 
 
 

 
20th-century mass murder in Europe
Ethnic cleansing in Europe
Massacres in Ukraine
Massacres in Belarus
Massacres in Russia
1910s murders in Europe
1920s murders in Europe